Bandafassi is a town in south-eastern Senegal about 750 km from Dakar near the borders with Mali and Guinea.<. It constitutes about half of the territory of the Arrondissement of Bandafassi of the Kédougou Department, eastern Senegal, The area constitutes the Bandafassi DSS (demographics surveillance site) of the INDEPTH Network.

The population includes ethnic groups Bedick (Bedik), Mandinka and Fula Bande.

References

External links

Satellite map at Maplandia.com

Populated places in Tambacounda Region